There is universal agreement that some Mesoamerican people practiced human sacrifice and cannibalism, but there is no scholarly consensus as to its extent.

At one extreme, anthropologist Marvin Harris, author of Cannibals and Kings, has suggested that the flesh of the victims was a part of an aristocratic diet as a reward, since the Aztec diet was lacking in proteins. According to Harris, the Aztec economy would not support feeding slaves (the captured in war) and the columns of prisoners were "marching meat".

Bernard R. Ortiz de Montellano has proposed that Aztec cannibalism coincided with times of harvest and should be thought of as more of a Thanksgiving. Montellano rejects the theories of Harner and Harris saying that with evidence of so many tributes and intensive chinampa agriculture, the Aztecs did not need any other food sources.

At the other extreme, William Arens doubts whether there was ever any systematic cannibalism.

Aztec cannibalism
The Mexica of the Aztec period are perhaps the most widely studied of the ancient Mesoamerican peoples. While most pre-Columbian historians believe that ritual cannibalism took place in the context of human sacrifices, they do not support Harris' thesis that human flesh was ever a significant portion of the Aztec diet.  Michael D. Coe states that while "it is incontrovertible that some of these victims ended up by being eaten ritually […], the practice was more like a form of communion than a cannibal feast".

Documentation of Aztec cannibalism mainly dates from the period after the Spanish conquest of the Aztec Empire (1519-1521):

In The Man-Eating Myth, Arens writes, "The gradual transformation of what little evidence is available for Aztec cannibalism is also an indication of the continual need to legitimize the Conquest". The following claims could have been exaggerated.

 Hernán Cortés wrote in one of his letters that a Spaniard saw an Indian...eating a piece of flesh taken from the body of an Indian who had been killed.

 The Historia general (compiled 1540-1585) by Bernardino de Sahagún (the first Mesoamerican ethnographer, according to Miguel León-Portilla) contains an illustration of an Aztec being cooked by an unknown tribe. This was reported as one of the dangers that Aztec traders faced.
 In his book Relación (1582), Juan Bautista de Pomar (c. 1535 – 1590) states that after the sacrifice the body of the victim was given to the warrior responsible for the capture. He would boil the body and cut it to pieces to be offered as gifts to important people in exchange for presents and slaves. It was rarely eaten, since they considered it of no value. Bernal Díaz reports that some of these parts of human flesh made their way to the Tlatelolco market near Tenochtitlan.
 In 2012 The National Institute for Anthropology and History (INAH) reported that they have discovered around 60 skeletons under subway lines in Mexico City, 50 children, and 10 adults, dating back 500 years. The skeletons appear to have cut marks on the bones that indicated human sacrifice, but does not indicate that cannibalism had occurred.

Bernal Díaz's account

Bernal Díaz's The Conquest of New Spain (written by 1568, published 1632) contains several accounts of cannibalism among the people the conquistadors encountered during their warring expedition to Tenochtitlan.

 About the city of Cholula, Díaz wrote of his shock at seeing young men in cages ready to be sacrificed and eaten.
 In the same work Diaz mentions that the Cholulan and Aztec warriors were so confident of victory against the conquistadors in an upcoming battle the following day, that "...they wished to kill us and eat our flesh, and had already prepared the pots with salt and peppers and tomatoes".
 
 About the Quetzalcoatl temple of Tenochtitlan Díaz wrote that inside there were large pots, where human flesh of sacrificed Natives was boiled and cooked to feed the priests.
 About the Mesoamerican towns in general Díaz wrote that some of the indigenous people he saw were:

Díaz's testimony is corroborated by other Spanish historians who wrote about the conquest. In History of Tlaxcala (written by 1585), Diego Muñoz Camargo (c. 1529 – 1599)  states that:

Controversy

Accounts of the Aztec Empire as a "Cannibal Kingdom", Marvin Harris's expression, have been commonplace from Bernal Díaz to Harris, William H. Prescott and Michael Harner. Harner has accused his colleagues, especially those in Mexico, of downplaying the evidence of Aztec cannibalism. Ortiz de Montellano presents evidence that the Aztec diet was balanced and that the dietary contribution of cannibalism would not have been very effective as a reward.

Cannibalism among the Xiximes
As recently as 2008, Mexico's National Institute of Archaeology and History (INAH) derided as a "myth" historical accounts by Jesuit missionaries reporting ritual cannibalism among the Xiximes people of northern Mexico. But in 2011, archaeologist José Luis Punzo, director of INAH, reported evidence confirming that the Xiximes did indeed practice cannibalism.

See also
 Human sacrifice in Aztec culture
 Spanish conquest of Yucatán

Notes

References
  
  
  
 
 
 

Cannibalism in North America
Pre-Columbian cultures
Mesoamerican diet and subsistence